Story Songs for Country Folks is a studio album by country music singer Faron Young with backing vocals by The Jordanaires. It was released in 1964 by Mercury Records (catalog SR-60896).

The album debuted on Billboard magazine's country album chart on February 15, 1964, peaked at No. 7, and remained on the chart for a total of 33 weeks.

AllMusic gave the album a rating of four-and-a-half stars.

Track listing
Side A
 "Rhinestones" (Merle Kilgore)
 "Saw Mill" (Horace Whatley, Mel Tillis)
 "Family Bible" (Claude Gray, Paul Buskirk, Walt Breeland)
 "Company's Comin'" (Johnny Mullins)
 "Pickin' Time" (Johnny Cash)
 "Busted" (Harlan Howard)

Side B
 "Sharecropper Family" (Jerry Smith)
 "Old Courthouse (Danny Dill, Wayne P. Walker)
 "Po Folks" (Bill Anderson)
 "Mama Sang a Song" (Bill Anderson)
 "Black Land Farmer" (Frankie Miller)
 "Y'all Come" (Arlie Duff)

References

1964 albums
Faron Young albums
Mercury Records albums